The Ontario Tech Ridgebacks are the athletic teams that represent Ontario Tech University in Oshawa, Ontario, Canada. The Ridgebacks have been competing in Ontario University Athletics since 2006 and have been a member of U Sports since 2008.

The Ontario Tech Ridgebacks compete in badminton, soccer, lacrosse, curling, golf, rowing, dance, and hockey. Formerly, the Ridgebacks had a tennis program. However, in 2016 after 10 seasons the university decided to eliminate the tennis program in favour of creating a badminton program.

Logo and mascot

UOIT's athletic team colours are blue and white.

The university's mascot and logo is based on a Rhodesian Ridgeback breed of dog. From the Ridgebacks' website, 2013:“[The Rhodesian Ridgeback] is a large and well muscled hunting dog that is legendary for its ability and use in hunting down lions. Strong and extremely competitive by nature, the Ridgeback is also lightning quick and deftly alert while constantly paying attention to its surroundings. Known as a dominant dog with aggressive instincts, the Ridgeback moves, not only like a hunting dog, but like a dog of prey. It is strong willed and confident and thrives on vigorous exercise and athletic activities. It is equally as tough in the water as it is on land.”

Men's ice hockey

The current head coach of the team is Curtis Hodgins. The coaching staff includes Brad Gauld, Paul Ranger, and Matt Reed. Hodgins took the role leaving the Cobourg Cougars (OJHL Junior A) mid-season 2015–16 to take over the reins former Head Coach Craig Fisher formerly resigned due to medical concerns. Craig Fisher, whose hiring was announced two weeks before the start of the 13-14 OUA playoffs, was the result of the university's search for new direction after the disappointment of recent seasons; placing emphasis on improving academics, and team culture.

In Curtis Hodgins' inaugural year (2015–16) with the Ontario Tech Ridgebacks the team set the new season high in wins and points, earned the team's first ever playoff round victory, and received the team's first ever vote for the CIS Top 10 ranking. His staff for the 2015–16 season was: Brad Gauld in the role of Associate Head Coach, John Blackburn, Matt Reed, and Matt Gauld. Following the success of '15-16, the Ridgebacks of 16–17, under Hodgin's tutelage, achieved CIS National Ranking for the first time in program history. Beginning Week 1 of the season at #9, achieving #5 following Week 2, and their highest ranking to date #4 on November 9, 2016.

History

The Ontario Tech Ridgeback men's ice hockey program began with Head Coach Marlin Muylaert; the first head coach of the program hired for the inaugural season.

Muylaert ended his seventh season behind the bench early and was let go midway through the '13–14 campaign. The assistant coach at the time, Justin Caruana, was given the interim head coach tag and completed the season with the rest of Muylaert's coaching staff, composed of Rob Whistle, David Brown, Ian Young, Matt Reed, and Strength and Conditioning Coach Mark Fitzgerald.

Regular season and playoff results

Skaters all-time/career season stat leaders 

*Denotes Active Player

Goalies all-time/career season stat leaders 

*Denotes Active Player

Skaters all-time/career playoff stat leaders 

*Denotes active player

Tennis
Announced in 2016 after 10 completed seasons competing in Tennis, the University announced the elimination of the program.

Rowing
The Ridgebacks rowing team was first established in 2005 and currently operate out of Durham Rowing Club in Port Perry, Ontario.  Currently the team competes in Ontario level regattas during the months of September and October. The team fields both men's and women's rowing at both novice and varsity levels.

Badminton
Announced in 2016, in conjunction with the elimination of the Tennis program, the university created and began the Badminton program. The inaugural coach for the introduction of the program is Wayne King, a decorated OUA badminton coach with years of experience with the University of Toronto badminton program.

References

External links
 

U Sports teams
Sport in Oshawa
Ridgebacks
2006 establishments in Ontario